Maspoli or Máspoli is a surname. It may refer to:

 Alexandre Maspoli (1875–1943), French sculptor and weightlifter
 Flavio Maspoli (1950–2007), Swiss politician
 Roque Máspoli (1917–2004), Uruguayan footballer